The cultural organization Routes of the Olive Tree is a non-governmental organization for research, documentation, protection and valorization of the civilization of the olive tree.

The Routes of the Olive Tree were inaugurated in 1998 as thematic cultural itineraries around the theme of the olive tree. They include local meetings with institutions and various events aiming at internationally promoting the history, gifts and civilization of the olive tree. The first experimental itineraries built bridges with the countries around the Mediterranean and with fellow travelers, friends and partners. Gradually a Euromediterranean network was built, leading to the creation of the Cultural Foundation of the same name, seated in Greece.

The Cultural Foundation "Routes of the Olive Tree" firmly believes that the best possible wrapping of a product is the culture and traditions linked to it. In this regard, it also visits non olive oil producing countries, its members acting as representatives of institutions and civil society, accompanied by friends of the olive tree and the motorcycle, scientists, researchers, craftsmen, farmers and artists from all the Mediterranean countries.

Activities 
Among the most active organizations on the field, the Routes of the Olive Tree have crossed more than 25 countries and have covered 130.000 kilometers of intercultural dialogue bearing "olive branches and civilization". These successful itineraries include exhibitions, cultural and business meetings, social activities, conventions, contests, as well as research and publications around the history, the symbolism and cultivation of the olive tree and the nutritious value of its products.

International recognition 
The Routes of the Olive Tree were nominated "International Cultural Itinerary of intercultural dialogue & sustainable development" in 2003 by the Unesco in 2003 and  "Great European Cultural Itinerary" in 2006 by the Council of Europe. They are under the auspices of the International Olive Council, the Hellenic Ministry of Culture and many other Greek and international institutions.

References

Sources
 Marinella Katsilieri, "12 months with the olive tree", Cultural Organization "Routes of the Olive Tree", 2006, 55 pages,  
 Marinella Katsilieri, "In the routes of the olive tree and mediterranean", Cultural Organization "Routes of the Olive Tree", 2006, 120 pages, 
 Collective work, "Ode to Olive Tree", Academy of Athens, 2006, 342 pages,

External links 
 Official Site
 European Institute of Cultural Routes

European Cultural Routes
1998 establishments in Europe
Olives